Nemanja Obrenović (born 11 July 1995) is a Serbian professional footballer who plays for PKB Padinska Skela.

References

External links 
 
 Profile at srbijafudbal.com

1995 births
Living people
Serbian footballers
Serbian expatriate footballers
Expatriate footballers in Italy
Expatriate footballers in Slovenia
Expatriate footballers in Belarus
Association football midfielders
FK Zemun players
NK Ankaran players
FK Kolubara players
FK Sinđelić Beograd players
FK Sloboda Užice players
FC Energetik-BGU Minsk players
OFK Bačka players
FK Radnički Sremska Mitrovica players
FK Smederevo players
FK Radnički Beograd players